The 2019–20 season was Al-Wehda's 36th non-consecutive season in the top flight of Saudi football and 75th year in existence as a football club. The club participated in the Pro League and the King Cup.

The season covered the period from 1 July 2019 to 9 September 2020.

Players

Squad information

Out on loan

Transfers and loans

Transfers in

Loans in

Transfers out

Loans out

Pre-season

Competitions

Overall

Overview

Goalscorers

Last Updated: 9 September 2020

Clean sheets

Last Updated: 9 September 2020

References

Al-Wehda Club (Mecca) seasons
Wehda